"Hasta Luego" (English: "See You Later") is a song performed by English singer Hrvy and Cuban-born Spanish/English singer Malu Trevejo. The song was released as a digital download on 25 April 2018 by Virgin EMI Records and features on the deluxe edition of his debut studio album Can Anybody Hear Me? The song peaked at number seventy on the UK Singles Chart. The song was written by Blair Dreelan, Chaz Mishan, Danny Shah, David Delazyn, Felicity Birt, Harvey Cantwell, Justus Nzeribe, Maria Luisa Trevejo, Nicolas Tevez and Pierre Hachar Jr.

Background
Hrvy had been a big fan of Latin music since his writing trips to Mexico. In an interview with the Official Charts Company, he said, "I just wanted to try something different. It’s a collaboration with one of my friends Malu, a Latin-American teen artist who has done some great things in the Latin market, so we thought to cross network and do a Spanish/English song. I’ve been to Mexico and have been writing and recording there, and I just think that the Spanish language sounds super sexy on a song, even if I don’t understand it."

Music video
A music video to accompany the release of "Hasta Luego" was first released on YouTube on 25 April 2018.

Track listing

Personnel
Credits adapted from Tidal. 
 Sky Adams – Producer, associated performer, background vocalist, bass (vocal), drums, guitar, keyboards, mixer, programming, recording engineer, studio personnel
 Blair Dreelan – Composer, lyricist, mixer, studio personnel
 Chaz Mishan – Composer, lyricist
 Danny Shah – Composer, lyricist, associated performer, background vocalist, guitar
 David Delazyn – Composer, lyricist
 Felicity Birt – Composer, lyricist
 Harvey Cantwell – Composer, lyricist, associated performer, vocals
 Justus Nzeribe – Composer, lyricist
 Maria Luisa Trevejo – Composer, lyricist, associated performer, vocals
 Nicolas Tevez – Composer, lyricist
 Pierre Hachar Jr. – Composer, lyricist
 Dick Beetham – Mastering Engineer, studio personnel

Charts

Release history

References

2018 songs
2018 singles
Hrvy songs
Malu Trevejo songs
Virgin EMI Records singles